Artemio Franchi (8 January 1922 – 12 August 1983) was an Italian football administrator.

Biography
He served as the President of the Italian Football Federation (1967–1976, 1978–1980), as the UEFA President (1973–1983), and as a member of the FIFA Executive Committee (1974–1983). He died in a road accident near Siena on 12 August 1983.

The home stadium of ACF Fiorentina and that of A.C. Siena are both named in his honour, as well as the Artemio Franchi Trophy. In 2011, he was posthumously inducted into the Italian Football Hall of Fame.

References

1922 births
1983 deaths
Sportspeople from Florence
Presidents of UEFA
Association football executives
Road incident deaths in Italy
Italian football chairmen and investors